Cyrus Nutt (September 4, 1814 – August 24, 1875) served as the fifth president of Indiana University.

Biography 
Cyrus Nutt was born in Southington Township, Trumbull County, Ohio on September 4, 1814. His father was James Nutt and his mother was Mary Viets who married in 1806. Cyrus was the second son, with one brother and two sisters who all lived in a log cabin on a piece of land next to a large farm belonging James father-in-law.

Cyrus Nutt graduated from Allegheny College (B.A. 1836). and became a professor of languages at Asbury (now DePauw) University (1837-1845), pastor of Methodist Episcopal church in Bloomington (1845), professor of Greek at Asbury University (1846-1849), president of Fort Wayne Female College (1849-1850), president of Whitewater College (1850-1855), professor of mathematics and acting president at Asbury University (1857-1860).

In 1860, Nutt was elected president of Indiana University. During his presidency, the University attempted to create an agricultural and mechanical school under the terms of the Morrill Act, though by 1869 Purdue was established as the land grant college of Indiana. In 1867, the Board of Trustees voted to admit women to classes, and around the same time the university experienced the beginning of organized athletics with students embracing the game of baseball. The junior and senior-class-controlled newspaper The Student also was founded that year.

The final years of Nutt’s presidency saw growing tensions with students, though the reasons are unknown. Students published a bogus newspaper in March 1873 titled The Dagger in which they attacked Nutt. In June 1875, Nutt retired from his position at the university and died on August 24, 1875, from remittent fever. He was buried in the Forest Hill Cemetery in Greencastle, Indiana.

Works
Several of Nutt's baccalaureate sermons were published.

Notes

References

External links
Indiana University President's Office records, 1857-1875

1814 births
1875 deaths
Allegheny College alumni
DePauw University faculty
Presidents of Indiana University
People from Trumbull County, Ohio
Asbury University faculty